Knox Coast, part of Wilkes Land, is that portion of the coast of Antarctica lying between Cape Hordern, at 100°31′E, and the Hatch Islands, at 109°16′E.

History
The coast was discovered in February 1840 by the U.S. Exploring Expedition (1838–42) under Lieutenant Charles Wilkes, and named by Wilkes for Lieutenant Samuel R. Knox, U.S. Navy, captain of the Flying Fish, who served as acting master on the Vincennes during the Antarctic cruise.

Features
Geographic features include:
 Cape Peremennyy

References

Coasts of Antarctica
Landforms of Wilkes Land